The San Joaquin Fault is a seismically active geological structure in the California Central Valley.  East of the San Joaquin fault there is a flow pattern of alluvium that has been reported to be a mud flow.  This flow pattern was deposited in the early Holocene or the late Pleistocene age.

See also
Hospital Creek, a tributary of the San Joaquin River draining the eastern slopes of part of the Diablo Range.
Ingram Creek, a tributary of the San Joaquin River.

References

Geography of the Central Valley (California)
Seismic faults of California